Koumogo is a small town in Chad.

Bridge 
A bridge over the Bragoto River collapsed, disrupting road traffic until the bridge was reconstructed.

References 

Populated places in Chad